Sherlock Holmes Versus Jack the Ripper is an adventure game for Microsoft Windows and Xbox 360, developed by Ukrainian studio Frogwares and distributed by Focus Home Interactive. It is the fifth game in the Sherlock Holmes series of adventure games developed by Frogwares. The game takes place in the London district of Whitechapel in 1888, the historical site of the Jack the Ripper murders.

Following the remastered version of Sherlock Holmes: The Awakened and Sherlock Holmes Versus Arsène Lupin, Sherlock Holmes versus Jack the Ripper offered the ability to play in a third-person perspective in addition to the first-person perspective. The French version of the game was released on 30 April 2009. The English version was released on 24 May.

Story 
The game is set in the late Victorian period, a time at which the British Empire was at its peak. As the premier world power, the United Kingdom was a model of wealth, yet Whitechapel was the capital's most squalid neighbourhood. Within its boundaries lived some of the country's poorest inhabitants including alcoholics, beggars, prostitutes, as well as a large community of Jewish immigrants fleeing Eastern Europe's ever growing antisemitism. In this terrible hole of misery, tens of thousands of people lived crammed within a maze of narrow, dank and dirty streets. In those streets, between 3 April 1888 and 13 February 1891, a series of horrifically violent murders occur. It is within this sinister and faithfully rendered setting, that Holmes must investigate, track and apprehend Jack the Ripper, thereby solving one of the greatest mysteries in criminal history.

Gameplay 
The player can play from a first- or third-person perspective as Holmes or Watson. Holmes and Watson arrive to inspect each crime scene after the murder takes place, giving the player a close-up look at Jack's work.

Each crime scene allows the player to reconstruct what happened, taking the pieces of evidence and linking them together until forming a conclusion. For instance, when examining the body of Annie Chapman, the player discovers pertinent clues such as blood on a fence, bruises under the right side of the jawbone, and a bloated tongue, which allows the player to deduce that the victim was killed while lying down after being choked with a left hand. These deductions are chosen from pulldown lists.

The player is also required to solve mysteries at Holmes' famous 221B Baker Street flat, a process which involves combing through dialogue and documents to establish murder times, before developing detailed theories about why the murders are being committed. The player pieces together torn-up notes, assembles objects, and takes on sliding-block challenges.

Characters 
 Sherlock Holmes: Famous consulting detective who lives in 221b Baker Street with his loyal friend Dr. John Watson. Holmes' methods are unique and he must put all of his exceptional powers of deduction in this case.
 Doctor John H. Watson: A doctor and Holmes' best friend. He will do whatever is possible in order to help his friend catch Jack the Ripper.
 Jack the Ripper: The serial killer who strikes at the sinister district of Whitechapel. He kills prostitutes with no mercy and mocks the police, and is regarded both as a madman and a genius.
 Inspector Frederick Abberline: A police inspector who refuses Holmes' help. He believes he can easily solve the case.
 Baker Street Irregulars: A gang of poor children who help Holmes and Watson in their difficult case.
 Francis Tumblety: An American doctor who happens to be in London at the time of the murders, known to dislike women in general.
 Walter Sickert: A painter who frequents the local brothel where the Ripper's victims were known to have worked.
 Jacob Levy: A butcher with a poor reputation due to past misdeeds.

Reception 

The game received mixed to positive reviews from critics. GameSpot negatively commented on the way the player gathers clues in the game, as they must first run errands for the police.

References

External links 

2009 video games
Adventure games
Sherlock Holmes (video game series)
Alternate history video games
Cannibalism in fiction
Crossover video games
Detective video games
First-person adventure games
Video games about Jack the Ripper
Video games based on Sherlock Holmes
Video games developed in Ukraine
Video games set in London
Video games set in the 19th century
Windows games
Xbox 360 games
Focus Entertainment games
Frogwares games
Single-player video games
Spiders (company) games